Rusty Rides Alone is a 1933 American Pre-Code Western film directed by D. Ross Lederman and starring Tim McCoy. The film was remade in 1939 as Riders of the Sage.

Cast
 Tim McCoy as Tim Burke
 Silver King the Dog as Silver - Tim's dog
 Barbara Weeks as Mollie Martin
 Dorothy Burgess as Mona Quillan
 Wheeler Oakman as Poe Powers
 Rockliffe Fellowes as Bart Quillan (as Rockcliffe Fellows)
 Edmund Burns as Steve Reynolds
 Clarence Geldart as Jim Martin (as Clarence Geldert)
 Jay Wilsey (uncredited)

References

External links
 

1933 films
1933 Western (genre) films
American Western (genre) films
American black-and-white films
1930s English-language films
Columbia Pictures films
Films directed by D. Ross Lederman
1930s American films